is a unisex Japanese given name used mostly by females and is occasionally used as a surname.

Possible writings
Chiaki can be written using different kanji characters and can mean:
千秋, "thousand, autumn"
千明, "thousand, light"
千晶, "thousand, sparkle"
千晃, "thousand, clear"
千瑛, "thousand, crystal ball"
智昭, "wisdom, shining"
The name can also be written in hiragana or katakana.

People
Chiaki (tarento) (千秋; born 1971), Japanese tarento
Chiaki Hara (千晶), a Japanese gravure idol and personality
, Japanese businesswoman
, Japanese swimmer
Chiaki Ishikawa (智晶; born 1969), Japanese singer
, Japanese alpine skier
Chiaki Ito (千晃; born 1987), member of the J-pop group AAA
Chiaki J. Konaka (千昭; born 1961), Japanese writer and scenarist
Chiaki Kawamata (千秋; born 1948), Japanese science fiction writer and critic
, Japanese voice actor
Chiaki Kon (千秋), Japanese anime director
Chiaki Kuriyama (千明; born 1984), Japanese actress, singer, and model
Chiaki Kyan (ちあき; born 1986), Japanese gravure idol
Chiaki Maeda (ちあき; born 1970), Japanese voice actress
, Japanese curler
, Japanese women's footballer
Chiaki Morosawa (千晶; born 1959), a Japanese anime screenwriter
Chiaki Mukai (千秋; born 1952), Japanese doctor and astronaut
Chiaki Ohara (千秋), Japanese pianist
Chiaki Omigawa (千明; born 1989), Japanese voice actress
Chiaki Satō (千亜妃; born 1988), Japanese actress and musician
, Japanese voice actress
, Japanese politician
, Japanese women's footballer
Naomi Chiaki (ちあき; born 1947), Japanese singer

Fictional characters
Chiaki Nagoya (千秋), a character in the manga/anime series Kamikaze Kaito Jeanne
Chiaki Konoike (千秋), a character in the manga series Tenjho Tenge
Chiaki Minami (千秋), a character in the manga series Minami-ke
Chiaki Saionji, a central character in the manga series The Demon Ororon
Chiaki Tani (千明), a character in Samurai Sentai Shinkenger
Chiaki Mamiya, a major character in The Girl Who Leapt Through Time
Shinichi Chiaki (千秋), a central character in Nodame Cantabile series
Chiaki Tachibana, a character in the video game Shin Megami Tensei III: Nocturne
Chiaki Yoshino (千秋), a male manga artist that pretends he is a female to the readers in the manga and anime series Sekaiichi Hatsukoi
Chiaki Kurihara, a central character in the anime series Bodacious Space Pirates
Chiaki Shinoda, a character in the anime Darker Than Black.
Chiaki Nanami (千秋) a main character in the video game Danganronpa 2: Goodbye Despair
 Chiaki Enno, a character in Zenki
 Chiaki Morisawa (千秋), a character in Ensemble Stars!
 Chiaki Koizumi (千秋), a central character in the webcomic My Impossible Soulmate.

Japanese-language surnames
Japanese unisex given names